The name Santa Cueva (Spanish "Holy Grotto") may refer to several places in Spain:

 Santa Cueva de Covadonga, in Principado de Asturias
 Santuario de la Cueva Santa in Altura in Castellón
 Oratorio de la Santa Cueva, church in Cádiz city, in the province of Cádiz
 Cave of Saint Ignatius, in Manresa, in the province of Barcelona
 Santa Cueva de Montserrat, origin of the Virgen de Montserrat (Virgen de la Moreneta) patron saint of Catalonia.